Devin Marie Kelley is an American actress.

She starred in the ABC drama series Resurrection playing Dr. Maggie Langston and also co-starred on the Fox crime drama The Chicago Code. She also starred in eight films, four of which are short movies.

Early life
Kelley was born and raised in St. Paul, Minnesota, not including the four years she spent with her family in Brussels, Belgium. She has a brother Ryan and a sister Lauren. Starting in the eighth grade, she took voice and acting lessons from her instructor, John Lynn. After graduating from Eastview High School in Apple Valley during 2004, Kelley moved to Los Angeles to attend the USC School of Theatre's BFA acting program. Kelley also spent a semester at the British American Drama Academy in London.

Career
Upon graduation, Kelley was accepted into the Williamstown Theatre Festival. Her breakout role was in The Chicago Code, which she prepared for by talking to female police officers, going on a ride-along with Chicago police officers, and visiting a shooting range and the Cook County Morgue. She later starred as a lead character in the 2012 horror film Chernobyl Diaries, and had a recurring role on Covert Affairs.

In 2013, Kelley was cast as Dr. Maggie Langston in the ABC drama series Resurrection.

Kelley has a recurring role as Shannon Diaz on 9-1-1.

Filmography

Film

Television

References

External links

21st-century American actresses
Actresses from Saint Paul, Minnesota
American film actresses
American television actresses
Living people
USC School of Dramatic Arts alumni
Year of birth missing (living people)